Shaheed Monsur Ali Medical College, Dhaka (SMAMC)() is a non government medical college in Uttara Model Town, Uttara, Dhaka, the capital of Bangladesh. It is affiliated with University of Dhaka.

It offers a five-year course of study leading to a Bachelor of Medicine, Bachelor of Surgery (MBBS) degree. A one-year internship after graduation is compulsory for all the graduates. The degree is recognised by the Bangladesh Medical and Dental Council.

History
The college was established as the Ummah Medical College in 1994–95 in Mirpur, Dhaka. It later shifted its premises to this site in 1998 under the current name Shaheed Monsur Ali Medical College and Hospital. It was and is named after Shaheed M. Mansur Ali, the 3rd Prime Minister of Bangladesh, and as the Finance Minister of the Mujibnagar Government he was a leader of Bangladesh's 1971 Liberation War as well. It was renamed in 2002 as the Moulana Bhasani Medical College under the Moulana Bhasani Trust. In October 2007, the college shifted to its own building, which was inaugurated by the ex-chairman of the Moulana Bhasani Trust. In February 2009, Dr. Jamal Uddin Chowdhury was elected as chairman of the Moulana Bhasani Trust, later Mrs. Laila Arjumand was elected as Chairman of Moulana Bhasani Trust and Dr. Jamal Uddin Chowdhury was elected as Chairman of Shaheed Monsur Ali Medical College. The institution was renamed to its current name of Shaheed Monsur Ali Medical College on April 3, 2010, in the presence of the Chairman of the Moulana Bhasani Trust Mrs.Laila Arjumand.

Campus

The academic building of the college is built on its own land having spacious classrooms, lecture galleries, practical classrooms, departmental museums, library, reading rooms etc. It also accommodates a cafeteria and separate common rooms for male and female students having facilities for indoor games. There are separate hostels for boys and girls. Students have facilities for outdoor games also. The entire library is covered by high speed WIFI internet. The river ‘Turag’ flows beside the campus of the college adding an unlimited fervor to the scenic beauty. It has a 750-bedded hospital with all modern amenities offering emergency, outdoor and indoor services round the clock.

The college was approved by the government of Bangladesh. It is affiliated with Dhaka University, and enjoys the recognition of the Bangladesh Medical and Dental Council (BMDC) as well as the World Health Organization (WHO). The college also has the recognition of postgraduate training in various subjects in the college hospital by the Bangladesh College of Physicians and Surgeons (BCPS).

Academics
The main course offered is the Bachelor of Medicine and Bachelor of Surgery MBBS for 5 years of study. The college follows the curriculum approved by the Dhaka University and Bangladesh Medical and Dental Council. The courses within are divided into the following subtopics:
 Pre-clinical subjects: Anatomy, Physiology and Biochemistry, Histology, Embryology.
 Pre-clinical subjects: Community medicine, Forensic medicine, Pharmacology, Pathology and Microbiology.
 Clinical Subjects: Obstetrics and Gynecology Medicine, Surgery and other related subjects.
 Basic medical subjects-Anatomy, Physiology, Biochemistry, Forensic Medicine, Community Medicine, Pathology, Microbiology, Pharmacology
 Clinical subjects-Medicine including Psychiatry and Dermatology, Surgery including Ophthalmology and Otolaryngology and Gynecology and Obstetrics

The college has admitted 27 batches of students since its inception. 21 batches of students have completed their MBBS course. The hospital is situated just beside the college building.

Location
The college conglomerate offers medical education, medical research, health care services and nursing education. This Medical College Hospital is situated at sector no. 11, of Uttara. The Turag River flows beside the campus of the college. The college's address is Plot # 26 & 26/A, Road #10, Sector #11, Uttara Model Town, Uttara, Dhaka-1230.

Alumni
In the year 2020 an association of the ex-students was founded.

See also
 List of medical colleges in Bangladesh

References

External links

Educational institutions of Uttara
Hospitals in Dhaka
Uttara
Universities and colleges in Dhaka
Educational institutions established in 1994
1994 establishments in Bangladesh
Medical colleges in Bangladesh